Noor Bano may refer to:

 Noor Bano (politician), Indian politician
 Noor Bano (TV serial), from Pakistan
 Nurbanu Sultan (1525–1583), Turkish princess
 Noor Bano (singer) (1942–1999), Pakistani singer

Bano, Noor